The  is a park with sports facilities in Maishima, Konohana-ku, Osaka, Japan. The official name in the Osaka City Ordinance is Osaka Port Sports Island (Osakakou Sports Island). The facility is owned by the city of Osaka, and is operated and managed by the Mizuno Group (a joint venture of Mizuno, Nankai Building Service, Japan Panause, and Hobby Life) as a designated manager.

References

External Links
 Maishima Sports Island - OSAKA INFO
 舞洲スポーツアイランド - Webpage of Mizuno

Konohana-ku, Osaka
Parks and gardens in Osaka
Sports venues in Osaka